Koos Waslander (born 3 February 1957) is a Dutch football coach and former player. He was most recently head coach of Dutch Tweede Klasse club RBC.

Career
Born in Rotterdam, Waslander played in the Netherlands and the United States for Excelsior, Fort Lauderdale Strikers, NAC Breda, PEC Zwolle and DS'79.

Waslander holds the record for the quickest goal in the Eredivisie, scoring after eight seconds.

With the Fort Lauderdale Strikers he was a Soccer Bowl '80 runner up. In the final, won 3-0 by New York Cosmos in September 1980, he entered the match as a substitute five minutes before half-time for the injured German striker Gerd Müller.

Coaching career
Waslander coached numerous teams in the Netherlands after his retirement, most notably VV Spijkenisse, Leonidas, and RBC. He also worked as an assistant and youth coach at NAC Breda.

References

1957 births
Living people
Dutch footballers
Footballers from Rotterdam
Dutch expatriate footballers
Expatriate soccer players in the United States
Dutch expatriate sportspeople in the United States
Association football midfielders
Eredivisie players
Eerste Divisie players
Excelsior Rotterdam players
NAC Breda players
PEC Zwolle players
FC Dordrecht players
Fort Lauderdale Strikers (1977–1983) players
North American Soccer League (1968–1984) players
RBC Roosendaal managers
VV DOVO managers
VV Spijkenisse managers
Dutch football managers